East Timor–India relations are the international relations that exist between East Timor and India. The Embassy of India in Jakarta, Indonesia is concurrently accredited to East Timor. East Timor has no diplomatic representation in India.

History 
Relations between East Timor and India date back to the early modern period. Indian traders traveled to the island in search of sandalwood. Trade links increased after the Portuguese colonisation of East Timor and portions of India. The Portuguese set up various garrisoned centres in India to carry out this trade, and all of Portugal's territories in Asia—including East Timor—were governed by the Portuguese Viceroy in Goa. Portuguese-trained Goan missionaries arrived in East Timor in the early 17th century, and were influential in spreading Catholicism in the country. Indians also traveled to East Timor to serve as soldiers, colonial bureaucrats, and missionaries. Some Indians arrived in East Timor in the late 19th century to work as migrant labour. A small community of Timorese nationals of Goan descent trace their heritage back to these previous generations of immigrants.

India was the second country to recognize the independence of East Timor. Minister of State for External Affairs, Omar Abdullah led a high-level delegation representing India at East Timor's Independence Day celebrations in May 2002. Abdullah presented letters of felicitations from the President of India, Prime Minister Atal Bihari Vajpayee and the External Affairs Minister. Diplomatic relations between the two countries was formally established on 24 January 2003. At the UN General Assembly in 2003, East Timor Prime Minister Mari Alkatiri announced his country's support for India's candidature for a permanent seat in the UN Security Council.

Indian diplomats Kamlesh Sharma and Atul Khare served as the Special Representative of Secretary General (SRSG) in East Timor until 2004 and 2009 respectively. India's DPR in New York was a member of the UN Security Council appointed team that visited East Timor in November to assess the situation on the ground and seek feedback from the all parties regarding the withdrawal of the United Nations Integrated Mission in Timor-Leste (UNMIT)’s and the situation in the country post-withdrawal.

East Timor voted for India's candidature for a non-permanent seat during 2011-12. The country also supported the election of Poonam Khetrapal Singh for the post of Regional Director, South East Asia Regional office (SEARO),WHO, in September 2013. East Timor co-sponsored a resolution moved by India at the UN General Assembly in January 2015, to declare 21 June as International Yoga Day.

Several high-level visits between officials of the two countries have taken place. East Timorese Vice Minister of Health Natalia D. Araujo visited Delhi to participate in the 'International Conference on Traditional Medicine for South East Asian Countries' in February 2013, and is the first East Timorese government official to visit India. Finance Minister Emília Pires visited India in May 2013 to attend the ADB Governors’ Meeting. Hernâni Coelho was the first East Timorese Foreign Minister to India. He arrived in the country on a two-day visit in 27–29 March 2016 and met with the Minister of External Affairs Sushma Swaraj, Minister of State for External Affairs Vijay Kumar Singh and the Minister of Health and Family Welfare.

Trade 
Bilateral trade between East Timor and India totaled US$3.45 million in 2015–16, declining by 3% from the previous fiscal. India exported $3.42 million worth of goods to East Timor, and imported $30,000. The main commodities exported by India to East Timor are pharmaceuticals, plastics and electrical machinery. The major commodity imported by India from East Timor is chemical products.

The first ever Indian business delegation to East Timor visited the country in October 2014, led by the Indian Ambassador to Indonesia. India provides East Timor with unilateral duty free tariff preferential (DFTP) market access for export of goods and services.

Some Indian firms have made investments in East Timor's oil & gas industry. They are active in oil and gas exploration off the coast of East Timor. Reliance Petroleum was awarded the rights to explore oil in two blocks (EEZ and the JPDA) in 2006 off the coast of East Timor. Reliance Petroleum began gas exploration in the Timor Sea in late 2010. Indian microfinance institution BASIX provided technical assistance to Timorese microfinance institution Tuba Rai Metin.

Tata Motors supplied 400 vehicles for use by the Timorese police and other government agencies in 2006.

Cultural relations
As of December 2016, around 25 Indians are employed as advisors in the various Ministries, UN agencies and international donors based in East Timor. There are also some Indian entrepreneurs, and others involved in trading and the restaurant business. There is a small community of Timorese nationals of Goan descent in East Timor. Some members of the community have achieved prominence in the country such as former Defense Minister Roque Rodrigues. Manuel Longuinhos was a Prosecutor General and the first-ever surgeon in East Timor. There are also a few prominent Indian ecumenical and business families.

Several East Timorese students study at Father Muller's educational institutions in Mangalore, Karnataka.

Foreign aid 
Assam-based Cane and Bamboo Technology Centre (CBTC) served as the technical partner for a project to establish a bamboo skills development and demonstration centre in East Timor that was initially begun by the United Nations Industrial Development Organization (UNIDO) in October 2004. The $1 million project is aimed at establishing bamboo as an important sector in East Timor, and was completed in May 2012.

The Government of India approved a grant in aid for infrastructure projects in East Timor in October 2008. The Indian Embassy in Jakarta donated $100,000 to East Timor in March 2010. In March 2014, India offered to establish a Centre of Excellence in Information Technology (CEIT) in East Timor. India donated a fully equipped ambulance unit which can serve as a mobile operation theatre, funded at a cost of  $71,0000 by the Indian Ministry of External Affairs, to the East Timor Health Ministry in January 2016.

IBSA will provide funding for the “Conservation Agriculture, Permaculture and Sustainable Fisheries Management: Enhancing Food and Nutrition Security and Reducing Risk Disaster in TL" project developed by FAO and two NGOs.

Citizens of East Timor are eligible for scholarships under the Indian Technical and Economic Cooperation Programme, the Indian Council for Cultural Relations, and the General Cultural Scholarship Scheme (GCSS). East Timorese diplomats have also attended the Professional Course for Foreign Diplomats (PCFD) organised by the Foreign Service Institute of the Ministry of External Affairs. India also provided training for East Timorese women in association with the East Timor Development Agency.

References

 
India
Bilateral relations of India
Indian political philosophy